Andrew Monteith (August 15, 1823 – February 1, 1896) was a Canadian businessman and political figure in Ontario. He represented Perth North in the Parliament of Ontario from 1867 to 1874 and in the House of Commons of Canada as a Conservative member for Perth North from 1874 to 1878.

He was born in County Tyrone, Ireland in 1823, the son of John Monteith, and came to Downie Township in Perth County, Upper Canada with his family in 1834. For a time, he worked with his brother who owned a store in Stratford. He served on the county council from 1850 to 1865 and on the town council for Stratford from 1857 to 1861. Monteith married Jane Dunsmore in 1850. He was elected to the 1st Parliament of Ontario in 1867; in 1874, he was elected to the House of Commons. He resigned from politics in 1878. He died at his home in Downie Township in 1896 after suffering a stroke.

His sons, John and Joseph, served as mayors of Stratford and were elected to the Ontario legislature. John's election was declared invalid on appeal.

Monteith Township in Parry Sound District was named after Andrew Monteith.

External links 

History of the County of Perth from 1825 to 1902, W. Johnston (1903)

1823 births
1896 deaths
Members of the House of Commons of Canada from Ontario
Progressive Conservative Party of Ontario MPPs
Conservative Party of Canada (1867–1942) MPs
Canadian people of Ulster-Scottish descent
People from Stratford, Ontario
Immigrants to Upper Canada
Irish emigrants to pre-Confederation Ontario